In anatomy, a heterodont (from Greek, meaning 'different teeth') is an animal which possesses more than a single tooth morphology.

In vertebrates, heterodont pertains to animals where teeth are differentiated into different forms.  For example, members of the Synapsida generally possess incisors, canines ("eyeteeth"), premolars, and molars. The presence of heterodont dentition is evidence of some degree of feeding and or hunting specialization in a species.  In contrast, homodont or isodont dentition refers to a set of teeth that possess the same tooth morphology.

In invertebrates, the term heterodont refers to a condition where teeth of differing sizes occur in the hinge plate, a part of the Bivalvia.

References

See also
 Diphodonty

Zoology
Dentition types